Predigerkirche (German for "Preacher's Church", after the Dominican Order which was also known as The Order of Preachers) may refer to the following churches:

 Predigerkirche (Erfurt) in Erfurt
 Predigerkirche (Zürich) in Zürich
 Predigerkloster in Zürich